SM the Ballad (stylized as S.M. THE BALLAD) is a South Korean ballad project group composed of singers from SM Entertainment. The group released its first extended play, Miss You, in 2010 and its second extended play, Breath, in 2014.

History

2010: Debut and Miss You
"Miss You", the lead single of the unit's first EP, was originally titled "When It Began" and was written as a duet song for Shinee. When Shinee members Onew and Jonghyun recorded the song, which included the rap vocals of member Minho, S.M. Entertainment intended to include the duet in Shinee's 2008 debut album, Replay. Due to incompatibility with their album's image, Shinee planned to release the song as a separate single. After a few more image changes, it was decided that the single would be performed by Xia Junsu, Super Junior's Kyuhyun, and Jonghyun. Two months prior to the EP's release, Junsu left S.M. Entertainment. The final plan was to include Jay Kim of the TRAX and new SM trainee, Jino, and the song title officially became "Miss You". With Jonghyun, Kyuhyun, Jay Kim, and Jino in the final line-up, S.M. the Ballad debuted their first performance of "Miss You" on SBS' Inkigayo on November 28, 2010. They released their album, Miss You, on November 29, 2010.

2014: Lineup changes and Breath

On February 3, 2014, S.M. Entertainment revealed, TVXQ's Max Changmin, Super Junior's Yesung, Zhang Liyin, Girls' Generation's Taeyeon, Super Junior-M's Zhou Mi, f(x)'s Krystal and Exo's Chen gathered to release a new EP together with original member Jonghyun. S.M. explained, "SM the Ballad is indeed planning to comeback [sic] very soon. We're going to reveal the details soon". It was later announced that the track list would contain songs in Korean, Japanese and Chinese.

On February 12, 2014, the members of SM the Ballad – with the exception of Changmin and Yesung – held a joint recital concert, performing the new songs from their album. Breath was released on February 13, 2014.

Members

2010 lineups
 Jay Kim (TRAX)
 Kyuhyun (Super Junior)
 Jonghyun (Shinee)
 Jino

2014 lineups
 Changmin (TVXQ)
 Yesung (Super Junior)
 Zhang Liyin
 Taeyeon (Girls' Generation)
 Jonghyun (Shinee)
 Zhou Mi (Super Junior-M)
 Krystal (f(x))
 Chen (Exo)

Discography

Extended plays

Videography

Other media
On January 4, 2011, SM Entertainment, together with NEOWIZ Internet Corporation, Ltd, released an iPhone application which features S.M. the Ballad's first mini-album Miss You. The app includes preview tracks of the album, an image gallery and clock, as well as the music videos for "Miss You" and "Hot Times".

References

External links
Official Website

SM Town
K-pop music groups
Musical groups established in 2010
South Korean idol groups
Musical groups disestablished in 2014
2010 establishments in South Korea
2014 disestablishments in South Korea